St Lawrence is a hamlet southwest of Bodmin, Cornwall, England, United Kingdom. From the Middle Ages until 1805 St Lawrence was the site of a lazar house (an institution for lepers). In 1805 its revenues were transferred to the Truro Infirmary.

References

Hamlets in Cornwall